Sir Thomas Percy Nunn (28 December 1870 – 12 December 1944) was a British educationalist, Professor of Education, 1913–36 at Institute of Education, University of London. He was knighted in 1930.

Early life
Nunn was born in Bristol in 1870. His grandfather and father were schoolmasters. He was interested in making of mathematical instruments and writing plays. He got his education at Bristol University College. He received his B.A in 1895.

Career
His career started as a secondary school teacher at grammar school in London in 1891. From 1891 till 1901 he developed methods of teaching which revolutionised the teaching of mathematics in the UK.

In 1903 he became a member of the staff in the London Day Training college. He worked as a part-time lecturer. In 1915 he attended the third Conference of the New Ideals in Education in Stratford where a group including Belle Rennie, William Mather and Nunn agreed that a new teacher training facility was required. This would lead to the Gipsy Hill College in South London which in time became a key part of Kingston University.

Nunn became a professor of education at the University of London. In 1922 was appointed Principal.

He was the president of the Aristotelian Society from 1923-1924.

Selected publications

References 

Richard Aldrich, 'Nunn, Sir (Thomas) Percy (1870–1944)’, Oxford Dictionary of National Biography, Oxford University Press, 2004 accessed                                                                        Sir (Thomas) Percy Nunn (1870–1944):                  * 
 'NUNN, Sir Percy’, Who Was Who, A & C Black, 1920–2008; online edn, Oxford University Press, Dec 2007, retrieved 26 January 2012
 http://www.aim25.ac.uk/cgi-bin/vcdf/detail?coll_id=2542&inst_id=5

1870 births
1944 deaths
British educational theorists
Knights Bachelor
Presidents of the Aristotelian Society
Academics of the UCL Institute of Education